Alternaria alternata f.sp. fragariae is a plant pathogen.

References

External links
 USDA ARS Fungal Database

Alternaria
Fungal plant pathogens and diseases
Forma specialis taxa
Fungi described in 1970